Samer is an Arabic male name literally means "informal friendly talk or chat to pass the night", "one to whom you speak", "congregation of those who spend the evening in pleasant conversation", "evening chat companion", "entertainer, companion". The name Samar has the same origin.

The name or adjective itself stems from the root verb samara (سَمَرَ) meaning "chat with one another at the night, having an evening of entertainment".

Notable people with the name include:
 Samer Awad (born 1982), Syrian footballer
 Samer Tariq Issawi (born 1979), Palestinian activist
 Samer Majali, Jordanian businessman
 Samer Al Marta (born 1972), Kuwaiti association football player
 Samer El Masri, Australian-Lebanese rugby league player
 Samer al-Masry (born 1969), Syrian actor
 Samer el Nahhal (born 1975), Finnish musician
 Samer Saeed (born 1987), Iraqi association football player
 Samer Salem (footballer, born 1992), Saudi footballer for Al-Najma
 Samer Salem (footballer, born 1993), Syrian footballer for Hutteen
 Samer Raimouny, Jordanian poet and activist
 Samer Libdeh, Jordanian-English journalist, researcher and policy analyst
 Samer Takriti, Syrian management scientist

Arabic masculine given names